Suzie Liles (born 1956) is an American fiber artist, master weaver, the owner of the Eugene Textile Center and co-owner of Glimakra USA, in Eugene,  Oregon.

Early life and education 
Susan "Suzie" Manzer Bickford, daughter of George Huff Bickford and Edith Ann Manzer, was born in 1956 in Portland, Oregon. She married Allen Liles in 1976, and they have four children. She married Robert Van Buskirk in 2008.

Liles completed a B.F.A. in Fibers (2004) and an M.F.A. in Fibers (2006) at the University of Oregon. Her M.F.A. terminal creative project, Concealing and Revealing, was advised by Barbara Setsu Pickett.

Career 
Liles began weaving in 1982. Liles' career as a professional weaver began in 1984, when she taught private classes at the Weavers Cabin in Roseburg, Oregon. From 1997–2015, she was the studio director at The Weavers’ School on Whidbey Island, Washington, with Madelyn van der Hoogt.  In 2002, she studied Jacquard weaving at the Lisio Foundation, in Florence, Italy.

From 2004–2006, Liles held a Graduate Teaching Fellowship at the University of Oregon teaching weaving classes, and in 2006–2007, she also was a fiber arts instructor at the Kansas City Art Institute. In 2011, she was a Workshop Instructor at the Penland School of Crafts in North Carolina.

She opened the Eugene Textile Center in Eugene, Oregon, with Marilyn Robert, in 2008; Liles became the sole owner in 2011. Since October 2015,  she has also co-owned Glimakra USA with her daughter Sarah Rambousek in Eugene, Oregon.

Critical reception 
The Oregon Weavers' Guild rated her weaving skills as excellent, noting, "Her knowledge of materials is unsurpassed, and her expertise is marked by a great number of commissions."

For an exhibit entitled, Something about Susan, Ellen Snellgrove described Liles' "weavings that show profiles of people. Because of the ambiguous nature of the figures' actions, visitors could either interpret these pieces as violent or loving."

Linda Sellers of The Register-Guard described her as a "master weaver", adding that Liles' creations are often displayed in Handwoven magazine.

Selected invited exhibitions 
Liles has participated in multiple invited exhibitions:
 2002 Treasure Troves Convergence, Instructors Exhibit, Vancouver, British Columbia
 2005 Graduate Student Invitational, Laverne Krause Gallery, Eugene, Oregon
 2006 Blue Ridge Handweaving Show, Asheville, North Carolina
 2006 One Woman Show, Latimer Textile Center, Tillamook, Oregon
 2006 Terminal 12, Jordan Schnitzer Museum of Art, Eugene, Oregon
 2006 Threads, Mahlon Sweet Airport Gallery, Eugene, Oregon
 2007 Members Exhibit at the Surface Design Association, Kansas City, Missouri
 2008 Jason’s Garden, Eugene Textile Center
 2009 Susan Show, Douglas County Library

Selected juried exhibitions 
She has participated in juried exhibitions since 1991:
 1991 NW Weavers Conference, Individual Exhibit, Eugene, Oregon
 1994, 1995 Douglas County Library Juried Exhibit, Roseburg, Oregon
 1996, 2000 Oregon Art Annual, Salem, Oregon
 1999, 2000 Best of Oregon Traveling Exhibit
 1999 Artist-in-Residence Exhibit, Roseburg, Oregon 
 1999 NW Weavers Conference Fashion Show, Eugene, Oregon
 2001 A Weaving Odyssey Fashion Show, Eugene, Oregon
 2002 From Rags to Riches, Betty Long Unruh Gallery, Roseburg, Oregon
 2004 Manipulate Fabrics Show, Interweave Press, Loveland, CO 
 2004 Something about Susan Group Show, Hallie Brown Ford Gallery, Roseburg, Oregon
 2004, 2010 Mayor’s Art Annual, Jacobs Gallery, Eugene, Oregon
 2007, 2008 Best of Oregon, Traveling Exhibit

Awards 
Liles earned a first place award at the Oregon Art Annual in 1996. She was also awarded the Handweavers Guild of America Certificate of Excellence in 1996.

The Weaving Guilds of Oregon twice awarded her the "Complex Weavers Award", in 1999 and 2000, in the Best of Oregon Travelling Exhibit, for "The Falconer" and "Dragon in the Forest".

In 2001, she also won "Best of Show" at A Weaving Odyssey Fashion Show, for a doubleweave blue silk dress and shawl with 12,00 sequins in individual pockets.

See also 
 Fiber art
 Mathematics and fiber arts
 Hand loom weavers

References

External links 
 

1956 births
Living people
20th-century American women artists
21st-century American women artists
American textile designers
American weavers
American women in business
University of Oregon alumni
Artists from Eugene, Oregon
Artists from Portland, Oregon
Women textile artists